, also known as YTS, is a Japanese broadcast network affiliated with the ANN. Their headquarters are located in Yamagata Prefecture.

History 
JOYI-TV (also known as YTS) signed on as the primary FNN affiliate for Yamagata Prefecture on 1 April 1970, and remained with that network for its first 23 years in operation. It shared JNN programs with JOEF-TV (YBC) until October 1989, when JOWI-TV (TUY) began broadcasting as the prefecture's JNN affiliate.

In September 1992, YTS announced that it would affiliate with the All-Nippon News Network (ANN) and carry programming from TV Asahi once its affiliation contract with FNN expired on 31 March of the following year. Prior to the affiliation switch (which occurred on 1 April 1993), YBC, YTS, and TUY all carried programs from ANN as secondary affiliations. Conversely, this left Yamagata Prefecture without a full FNN affiliate for four years until JOCY-TV signed on as the new FNN affiliate on 1 April 1997. In the interim, JOOX-TV (from Sendai, which served eastern portions of Yamagata) served as the network's default over-the-air affiliate and that station, JOBI-TV from (Akita), and JOPX-TV (from Fukushima) were carried by regional cable television providers.

YTS began broadcasting in digital on 1 June 2006. The station's broadcasting area was affected by the 11 March 2011 earthquake, but received minimal damage compared to the devastation seen in the eastern areas of Tōhoku. Due to these circumstances, YTS officially terminated its analog television service as originally scheduled on 24 July 2011.

Stations

Analog stations 
Yamagata(Main Station) JOYI-TV 38ch
Tsuruoka 39ch
Shinjo 58ch
Yonezawa 58ch

Digital stations(ID:5) 
Yamagata(Main Station) JOYI-DTV 18ch
Yonezawa 34ch

Rival stations 
Yamagata Broadcasting Company (YBC)
TV-U Yamagata (TUY)
Sakuranbo Television Broadcasting (SAY)

References

External links
 Yamagata Television System

All-Nippon News Network
Asahi Shimbun Company
Television stations in Japan
Television channels and stations established in 1970
Mass media in Yamagata, Yamagata